Tom Rooney may refer to:

 Tom Rooney (Florida politician) (born 1970), United States Representative from Florida's 17th (and previously 16th) Congressional District
 Tom Rooney (Illinois politician) (born 1968), member of the Illinois Senate
 Tom Rooney (racing driver) (1881–1939), American racecar driver